Tom Varey is a British actor. He is known for his roles in Pond Life, No Offence and Ridley Road.

Early life 
Varey grew up in Mossley, Greater Manchester. He studied at the Royal Academy of Dramatic Art for three years from 2011 to 2014.

Career 
After graduating, Varey starred as Bert Middleton in series two of BBC One series The Village. From 2015, he had a main role in the Channel 4 television series No Offence as PC Stuart O’Connor, playing the role for all three series until the programme ended in 2018. In 2016, he featured in an episode of the sixth season of Game of Thrones as Lord Cley Cerwen and in episode 1 of ITV series Dark Angel as Billy Mowbray. Varey played PE teacher Will Simpson for the first two series of Ackley Bridge from 2017 to 2018. Varey starred as Trevor in the feature film Pond Life in 2018. He also appeared in episode 5 of Death in Paradise in 2020. In October 2021, he played Jack Morris in Ridley Road.

Filmography

References

External links 

21st-century English male actors
Male actors from Manchester
Alumni of RADA
English male film actors
English male television actors
Living people
People from Mossley
Year of birth missing (living people)